On 22 April 2018, a suicide bombing killed 70 people and wounded dozens more Sunday at a voter registration center in Koche Mahtab Qala, in the Hazara-majority Dashte Barchi area of western Kabul, Afghanistan. In addition to the fatalities, at least 120 others were injured in the attack.

Reactions 
ISIL's Afghan branch claimed responsibility for the attack through Amaq News Agency, saying it had targeted Shia Hazara.

Internationally, the attack was condemned by nations including the U.S., and organizations including the United Nations.

See also 
 Wakil Hussain Allahdad
 List of terrorist incidents in March 2018
 List of terrorist attacks in Kabul

References 

2018 murders in Afghanistan
22 April suicide bombing
22 April 2018 suicide bombing
21st-century mass murder in Afghanistan
April 2018 crimes in Asia
Attacks on buildings and structures in Afghanistan
ISIL terrorist incidents in Afghanistan
22 April 2018 suicide bombing
Islamic terrorist incidents in 2018
Mass murder in 2018
22 April 2018 suicide bombing
Massacres of Hazara people  
Suicide bombings in 2018
22 April 2018 
Terrorist incidents in Afghanistan in 2018 
Violence against Shia Muslims in Afghanistan
Attacks in Afghanistan in 2018